Birkeland is a lunar impact crater that lies in the southern hemisphere on the far side of the Moon. This crater is attached to the central waist of the oddly shaped Van de Graaff crater formation, and may partly account for that crater's figure-8 shape. To the southeast is the large walled plain Leibnitz.

This crater has not been significantly eroded, and the outer rim is well-defined with a well-terraced inner walls around much of the interior. The rim has a slight inward bulge along the north where it is attached to the Van de Graaff formation. The interior floor is relatively level, except in the southeast where there is some rough terrain. There is a central peak formation at the midpoint.

Satellite craters
By convention these features are identified on lunar maps by placing the letter on the side of the crater midpoint that is closest to Birkeland.

References

 
 
 
 
 
 
 
 
 
 
 
 

Impact craters on the Moon